Drom & Inch GAA is a Tipperary GAA club which is located in County Tipperary, Ireland. Both hurling and Gaelic football are played in the "Mid-Tipperary" divisional competitions. The club is centred on the villages Drom, Inch and Barnane which lie near the Devil's Bit mountain range. The club's main grounds is located in Bouladuff, five miles outside Thurles. It is located on the main Thurles to Nenagh R498 road. The club's second pitch is located in Drom Village on the road from Borrisoleigh to Templemore. The club won its first ever Tipperary Senior Hurling Championship in 2011 after a 1–19 to 2–14 win against Clonoulty–Rossmore GAA.

History
Drom & Inch Gaa club finds its origins back as far as 1887, when hurling was played by the separate teams of Drom, and Inch. The club is located in the heartland of hurling in Co. Tipperary. Recent history shows an emerging club that has established itself as one of the top clubs in Tipperary, both in terms of facilities and competitive teams. Drom & Inch have enjoyed success over the past 5 years at every level on the pitch and a landmark achievement in 2008 when 4 of Tipperary's 15 players, that won the National Hurling League and Munster Championship, came from the parish they were Séamus Butler, Séamus Callinan, Éamonn Buckley and James Woodlock. Drom & Inch has often had players on All Ireland winning Tipperary teams down throughout the years. Drom & Inch have won county titles in hurling at every age from U-12 to Senior level. It has 4 large dressing rooms, a kitchen, male & female toilets, meeting room, hydrotherapy tank, scoreboard, dugouts, sandbank, ball-wall and roofed stand.

2011 saw the club achieve its best ever year on the hurling field, when Drom & Inch were crowned Tipperary Senior Hurling Champions for the first time in their history. Adding to the senior win in 2011 was the all conquering U14 team which won county A titles in hurling and football, minor B hurlers winning county final and Junior B hurlers winning county final.

Facilities developments

In the early days of the Association, Drom and Inch fielded separate teams. Inch hurlers would train and play in Ryan's field adjacent to the present-day community centre. In 1934 a field at Maheragh was acquired from the Land Commission. This was part of a nationwide drive by the GAA at that time to provide 'a field in every parish'. The Gaels of Drom and Barnane trained at two locations; one near Sheppard's Cross in Barnane and the other a short distance east of Drom village. By the time the current pitch in Drom was obtained in the mid-1960s, the two sides of the parish were united on the playing fields.

As efforts continued to grow and develop the club in the 1980s, the need for new facilities was recognised. Following much debate, a club meeting in November 1986 voted to purchase seven acres from John Egan of Inch House. Extensive work was required to develop the site, and a massive fundraising drive by an army of club members raised the necessary finance. Dressing rooms, sideline seating and a stand were constructed. By the time of the official opening in May 1990, the club had a modern ground of which it could be proud. The old pitch was purchased by the County Camogie Board and it too has been extensively redeveloped over the years.

In the mid-1990s improvements were made to Drom field, including levelling of the pitch and erection of nets behind the goals. It is now used mainly for juvenile training and games. Developments at Bouladuff continued apace into the new millennium. The dressing rooms were extended to provide space for meetings, a kitchen and toilets. The newest facility is the floodlit hurling wall which has already proved popular with many visiting club and inter-county teams.

In 2018, together with Drom & Inch Camogie Club, Drom & Inch launched the Club Development Plan. A sub-committee was established and ideas were hatched for future facility developments. Through various national grant schemes and from generous donations from members of the Drom & Inch Supporters Club, a purchase of land surrounding the existing Drom field was made. The club wasted no time in improving the infrastructure of Drom field by clearing existing ditches and laying drainage pipes and ducting for possible future lighting. Whilst all these works were being carried out, the ball wall facilities in The Ragg received an upgrade by replacing the stone/dust surface with a state of the art astro turf including netting and fencing.

Notable players
 Éamonn Buckley
 Paudie Butler
 Séamus Butler
 Tommy Butler
 Séamus Callanan
 Mick Kennedy (Limerick hurler) ??? is in the category but club isn't mentioned
 Pat Looby
 Johnny Ryan
 James Woodlock

Roll of Honour – Championship Only
Note, age grades changed from even numbers to odd numbers in 2021

Hurling

Senior Hurling
 County (1): 2011
 Mid Tipperary Senior Hurling Championship (8): 1974, 1984, 2006, 2008, 2009, 2013, 2014, 2019

Intermediate Hurling
 Mid Tipperary Intermediate Hurling Championship (5): 1970, 1994, 1995, 2015, 2018
 County (1): 1970

Junior A Hurling
 Mid Tipperary Junior A Hurling Championship (10) :1937, 1944, 1951, 1963, 1970, 1992, 1993, 1999, 2004, 2005.
 County (3):1937, 1970, 2005

Junior B Hurling
 Mid Tipperary Junior B Hurling Championship (6): 1997, 2003, 2004, 2005, 2011 2019
 Tipperary Junior B Hurling Championship (2) : 2011, 2019

U-21 Hurling
 Mid Tipperary Under-21 A Hurling Championship (7): 1964, 1966, 1999, 2000, 2001, 2005, 2007
 Mid Tipperary Under-21 B Hurling Championship (2) 1991, 1996
 Tipperary Under-21 A Hurling Championship (2): 1999, 2000

Minor / U-19 Hurling
 Mid Tipperary Minor A Hurling Championship (9): 1961, 1962, 1963, 1996, 1997, 1998, 2004, 2015, 2019
 Mid Tipperary Minor B Hurling Championship (8) 1984, 1990, 1995, 2002, 2003, 2008, 2011, 2018
 Tipperary Minor A Hurling Championship (3): 1940, 1998, 2019
 Tipperary Minor B Hurling Championship (5) 1984, 1995, 2003, 2011, 2018

Football
Minor / U-19 Football

 Mid Tipperary Minor A Football Championship (3): 2004, 2013, 2015
 Mid Tipperary Minor B Football Championship (4) 2009, 2011, 2012, 2018
 Tipperary Minor A Football Championship (1): 2015

U-21 Football

 Mid Tipperary Under-21 A Football Championship (1) 2016
 Mid Tipperary Under-21 B Football Championship (1) 2011

Junior A Football

 Mid Tipperary Junior A Football Championship (6) : 1975, 1984, 1992, 2004, 2012, 2013
 Tipperary Junior A Football Championship (2): 1975, 2013

Intermediate Football

 Mid Tipperary Intermediate Football Championship (1): 1975
 Tipperary Intermediate Football Championship''' (2): 2014, 2021

All-Ireland Medal Winners in the club

On 18 August 2019, Séamus Callanan had the unique honor of captaining Tipperary Senior hurlers to the All Ireland Championship. This was Seamus's third All Ireland medal and first as captain. The first captain from Drom & Inch. Seamus also received his fourth GAA/GPA All Star Award and Hurler of the Year. Jamie Moloney was a member of the Tipperary extended panel. The following week, Tipperary defeated Cork in the first All Ireland U-20 final. Eoin Collins was sub-goalie for Tipperary for the championship. On 26 August 2018, Tipperary U-21 hurlers defeated Cork 3–13 to 1–16 in a pulsating All-Ireland final in Limerick. Despite losing to Cork in the Munster final, Tipp came through the back door defeating Galway in the semi final for another chance at playing Cork. Drom & Inch players Pauric Campion and Stevie Nolan were part of the first fifteen. Podge lined out at wing back and Stevie started at midfield scoring a superb goal in the second half.
Séamus Callanan won his second senior All-Ireland medal on 4 September 2016. Seamus scored 13 points for Tipperary from full forward on the day and received the Man of the Match Award for his efforts. Seamus's displays in 2016 won him his third consecutive GAA/GPA All Star Award. Liam Ryan was also a member of the extended panel. On the same day, Stevie Nolan was a member of the Tipperary Minor hurling panel that also won the All-Ireland. The first time since 1949 that Tipperary won both in the same year. Brothers David (2012) and Micheal Butler (2013) won All-Ireland Intermediate Hurling medals when defeating Kilkenny on both occasions, David played corner forward in the 2012 final while Micheal played full back in the 2013 decider. On 5 September 2010 Séamus Callanan and James Woodlock won all Ireland Senior medals with Tipperary when they defeated reigning champions Kilkenny on a scoreline of 4.17 to 1.18. Seamus came on in the 52nd minute scoring two points, while James was on the panel. On Sunday 3 September 2006 Johnny Ryan and Séamus Callanan played major roles in bringing the All-Ireland minor title back to Tipperary for the first time since 1996; Paudie Butler was coach over the team at that time. Dick Byron was the first All-Ireland minor medal winner in the parish in 1936, he was followed by Eamon Bourke in 1952 and Pat Looby won an All Ireland minor medal in 1976 which was quickly followed up with an All-Ireland U21 medal in 1979, while Pat finished his All-Ireland collection with a masters All-Ireland in 2003. Tom Butler won All-Ireland Senior Hurling medal with Dublin Kickhams in 1889. Tom was grand uncle of the present Butler generation. Tom Barry of Dovea won two All-Ireland Senior Hurling medals with Dublin in 1924 and 1927. Phil Farrell of Drom was on the Dublin winning team of 1938. Stephen Kenny, Dovea won senior Hurling medal with Tipperary in 1925 and was also on the first Tipperary team to tour America. Another great Drom & Inch man was Mick Kennedy who starred on the Limerick team of the thirties. Seamus Bannon won All-Ireland Senior Hurling medals with Tipperary in 1949, 1950 and 1951. Eamonn Butler captained the county Intermediate team that won the all-Ireland in 1971, also representing Drom that day were Seamus Butler, Oliver Quinn and Jim Carey. Johnny Harkins, Paudie Butler, Tommy Butler and John Hassett have all won Masters All-Irelands with Tipperary.

References

External links
Tipperary GAA site
Drom-Inch GAA site

Gaelic games clubs in County Tipperary
Hurling clubs in County Tipperary
Gaelic football clubs in County Tipperary